The Northern dynasties (北朝 běi cháo) describe a succession of Chinese empires that coexisted alongside a series of Southern dynasties. The era is generally described as the Northern and Southern dynasties, lasting from 420–589 AD after the Jin and before the Sui dynasty.

The Northern dynasties were as follows:
 Northern Wei (386–534 AD)
 Eastern Wei (534–550 AD)
 Western Wei (535–557 AD)
 Northern Qi (550–577 AD)
 Northern Zhou (557–581 AD)

See also 
List of emperors of the Southern dynasties
Northern and Southern dynasties
Chinese sovereign

Lists of Chinese monarchs
Lists of leaders of China
Lists of Chinese people